Agham is the Filipino word for science, and may refer to:

Advocates of Science and Technology for the People, more popularly known as Agham, is a Philippine-based non-governmental science advocacy organization affiliated with Bagong Alyansang Makabayan
Alyansa ng mga Grupong Haligi ng Agham at Teknolohiya para sa Mamamayan, abbreviated as AGHAM, a partylist organization in the Philippines running to represent science and technology interests in the Philippine Congress

Other topics
Agham Kot, a ruined town in Sindh, Pakistan

See also
Agam (disambiguation)